The Arusha Declaration Monument is a landmark monument and tourist attraction located in Kati ward  in Arusha, Tanzania. It was unveiled in 1977 by the nation's ruling Chama Cha Mapinduzi (CCM) party to commemorate ten years of the Arusha Declaration. It is situated along Makongoro Road at the centre of the roundabout.

In April 2015, part of the monument was vandalised when one of its copper plaques was stolen.

Gallery

See also
Ujamaa

References

Monuments and memorials in Tanzania
Buildings and structures in Arusha
Tourist attractions in the Arusha Region
Vandalized works of art